"Red Roses" is the debut single by American rapper and singer Lil Skies featuring fellow American singer Landon Cube. It was released for digital download on June 25, 2017, as the lead single from the former's mixtape Life of a Dark Rose. The song is one of the two first Lil Skies songs (alongside "Nowadays", another collaboration with Landon Cube) to reach the Billboard Hot 100, debuting at number 98 and peaking at number 69. The song is a global hit, racking up over 300 million streams on each streaming service it was released through.

Music video
On October 18, 2017, Cole Bennett uploaded the music video for "Red Roses" on his YouTube account. The music video currently has over 251 million views as of October 2022.

The visual shows the artists seated in front of an RV. A woman walks past them and they follow her.

Charts

Weekly charts

Year-end charts

Certifications

Release history

References

2017 songs
2017 debut singles
Atlantic Records singles
Lil Skies songs
Music videos directed by Cole Bennett
Songs written by Lil Skies